Sayn-Wittgenstein-Karlsburg was a cadet branch of Sayn-Wittgenstein-Berleburg, created by Graf Casimir (ruled 1694–1741) for his younger brother Count Karl Wilhelm (1694–1749).

Counts of Sayn-Wittgenstein-Karlsburg (1694–1806)
 Karl Wilhelm (1694–1749)
 Adolph Ludwig Wilhelm (1749–1806)

1806 disestablishments
States and territories established in 1694
1694 establishments in the Holy Roman Empire